Aurore Sourcebook is a supplement published by Game Designers' Workshop in 1987 for the science fiction role-playing game 2300 AD.

Contents
Aurore Sourcebook is a campaign setting that describes in detail the planet Aurore, the furthest human outpost on the French Arm.  The book covers geography, weather, native biology, the colonies and their history, the Kafer invaders, important personalities, and suggestions for scenarios. It also includes eight pages of color plates.

Publication history
Aurore Sourcebook was written by William H. Keith, Jr., with a cover by Steve Venters, and was published in 1987 by Game Designers' Workshop as a 96-page book.

Reception
In the May 1988 edition of Dragon (Issue #145), Jim Bambra thought this book "contains a wealth of detail and is stuffed full of adventure ideas... Great care and inspired design have gone into this book." Bambra concluded, "The Aurore Sourcebook is highly recommended as a fully fledged science-fiction setting and as a world of adventure."

Other reviews
Tidewater Traveller Times Volume 1, Issue 5 (Oct 1987, p. 5)

References

2300 AD supplements
Role-playing game supplements introduced in 1987